Jan Alfons Wyrowiński (born 27 August 1947, Brusy) is a Polish politician and Kashubian activist. He was the chairman of Kashubian-Pomeranian Association in the period 1994–1999.

References

1947 births
Living people
People from Brusy
Polish politicians
Kashubian people
Polish engineers
Freedom Union (Poland) politicians
Democratic Union (Poland) politicians
Civic Platform politicians
Solidarity (Polish trade union) activists
Gdańsk University of Technology alumni
Recipient of the Meritorious Activist of Culture badge